The 2021 Tour du Finistère was the 35th edition of the Tour du Finistère road cycling one day race, which was held on 22 May 2021, starting in the town of Saint-Evarzec and finishing in Quimper. It was a category-1.1 event on the 2021 UCI Europe Tour and the fifth event of the 2021 French Road Cycling Cup.

The race was won in a sprint by Benoît Cosnefroy ahead of Sean De Bie and Rasmus Tiller.

Teams 
Four UCI WorldTeams, seven UCI ProTeams, and three UCI Continental teams made up the fourteen teams that participated in the race. Each team entered up to seven riders, with some only sending six. 76 of the 89 riders in the race finished.

UCI WorldTeams

 
 
 
 

UCI ProTeams

 
 
 
 
 
 
 

UCI Continental Teams

Result

References 

Tour du Finistère
Tour du Finistère
Tour du Finistère